Gilmanton is a census-designated place located in the town of Gilmanton, in Buffalo County, Wisconsin, United States. Gilmanton has a post office with ZIP code 54743. Its population was 131 in 2017.

References

Unincorporated communities in Buffalo County, Wisconsin
Unincorporated communities in Wisconsin
Census-designated places in Buffalo County, Wisconsin
Census-designated places in Wisconsin